Lukáš Lacko was the defending champion, but he chose to not participate this year.
Evgeny Kirillov won in the final 6–3, 2–6, 6–2, against Zhang Ze.

Seeds

Draw

Finals

Top half

Bottom half

References
Main Draw
Qualifying Singles

2010 ATP Challenger Tour
2010 Singles